Ta Ra Rum Pum is a 2007 Indian Hindi-language sports drama film directed by Siddharth Anand from a screenplay penned by Habib Faisal. It stars Saif Ali Khan, Rani Mukerji, Angelina Idnani, Ali Haji and Javed Jaffrey in lead roles. In the film, newly-successful professional racer Rajveer "RV" Singh (Khan) success and tribulations within the U.S. stock car racing scene, supported by his pianist-wife Radhika "Shona" Bannerjee (Mukerji).

Ta Ra Rum Pum draws inspiration from the films Days of Thunder (1990), Talladega Nights: The Ballad of Ricky Bobby and The Pursuit of Happyness (both 2006), and marks Khan and Mukerji's second collaboration, after Hum Tum (2004), which was co-written by Anand. The film marks the second collaboration between Anand and Khan, after Salaam Namaste (2005). Principal photography began in May 2006 and lasted until that June, with the filming locations including the Milwaukee Mile, the Rockingham Speedway, and on set in Mumbai. 

Ta Ra Rum Pum theatrically released in India by Yash Raj Films on April 27, 2007. The film emerged as a moderate commercial success, grossing  worldwide, thus becoming the tenth highest grossing Hindi film of 2007. It received mixed reviews from critics upon release, with praise for its setting, and Khan and Mukherji's performances, but criticism for its screenplay, length and pacing.

Plot 
Rajveer "RV" Singh, a happy-go-lucky race track pit crew member and aspiring racer, lands a professional stock car racing contract with the Speeding Saddles, a struggling racing team, after illegally speeding a New York City taxi owned by the team manager and his eventual agent, Harry. 

RV soon becomes a successful racer, and later marries Radhika "Shona" Shekar Rai Bannerjee, a pianist and music major at Columbia University, despite the disapproval of Radhika's father, businessman Shubho Shekhar, due to the pair's lack of academic degrees and conventional employment. After the wedding, Shona leaves her career to care for their two children, Priya "Princess" Singh and Rajveer "Champ" Singh Jr., as RV and Speeding Saddles become the sport's most acclaimed.

Eight years later, during a race, rival racer Rusty Finkelstein crashes into RV's car, severely injuring and hospitalizing him. RV returns to the sport a year later but finishes last in each race owing to post-traumatic stress disorder (PTSD) from his accident. Exasperated, the team owner Billy Bhatia fires RV and replaces him with Rusty.

After the couple fails to get alternative employment (including a failed attempt by RV to create a breakaway team with Harry), their house is foreclosed, and most of their possessions, including Shona's wedding ring, are auctioned off to pay creditors. With only about $2,000 left to their name, the family moves into a one-bedroom apartment on the outskirts of the city.

Determined to keep their children at their private school, Shona and RV take several odd jobs; RV attempts to abandon the family dog, Bruno, to ease the burden on them. Bruno is returned by Harry, who offers RV his taxi license; he rejects it due to Harry's continued employment with the Speeding Saddles but eventually accepts it. Shona later gets a job as an events pianist and runs into Shubho, who offers the family assistance, but she rejects it after he insults RV. Princess overhears RV and Shona fighting and learns of their financial trouble. She tells Champ and the pair decide to secretly save their lunch money to help their parents. This results in Champ eating waste food from the garbage.  

RV gets a passenger who asks for a speedy airport arrival; using it as a chance to test his racing skills, RV initially does well but falters after suffering flashbacks of his accident. In a last-ditch attempt to pay their school fees (and throw a birthday party for Champ), RV lies to his friends and fellow cab drivers saying Princess has pneumonia, prompting them to pool a fund for her medical expenses.

Shona finds out that RV lied to his friends about Princess having pneumonia and gets enraged at RV. However, Champ suddenly falls unconscious and begins bleeding from his mouth. The family rushes him to the hospital and then RV and Shona learn the truth that Princess and Champ have been saving their lunch money to help the financial issue, where they find out Champ has a piece of glass in his stomach, and surgery to remove it would cost $65,000. After Billy rebuffs his plea for help, Harry offers RV the chance to make their team and get back into the racing world. RV accepts the offer and his cab driver friends form the pit crew and accept RV's apology for lying to them about Princess having pneumonia. RV encounters Rusty and remembers his accident with him. He tempts to come last in the race but remembers about his son's condition and it motivates him to keep going. Rusty tries to shove RV, but RV shoves Rusty in the same way that Rusty did and kills Rusty and wins the race.

RV returns to racing full-time, Shona becomes a professional pianist, and the family (including a now healthy Champ) moves back to their original home. RV then gifts Shona her wedding ring.

Cast
 Saif Ali Khan as Rajveer "RV" Singh, a stock car racer, Radhika's husband, and Princess and Champ's father
 Rani Mukerji as Radhika "Shona" Bannerjee, RV's wife and Princess and Champ's mother
 Angelina Idnani as Priya "Princess" Singh, RV and Shona's daughter and Champ's elder sister
 Ali Haji as Ranveer "Champ" Singh Jr., RV and Shona's son and Princess's younger brother
 Javed Jaffrey as Harry, RV's best friend, and later manager
 Victor Banerjee as Shubho Shekhar Rai Banerjee, Radhika's father
 Shruti Seth as Sasha, Radhika's best friend
 Bharat Dabholkar as Billy Bhatia
 Sujoy Ghosh as Chatto
 Ronobir Leheri as Pindi
 Ravi Khote as Pandya
 Dolly Bindra as Mrs. Pandya
 Ken Thompson as Rusty Finkelstein

Production 
Production began in May 4, 2006 and lasted till June 26, 2006. The working title was "Ta Ra Rum Pum Pum". The film was shot almost entirely in the US, with a few scenes shot at YRF Studios in Mumbai. Portions were filmed in Rockingham, North Carolina at the Rockingham Speedway and at West Allis, Wisconsin at The Milwaukee Mile. Ali Haji had to go through 3 auditions and Angelina Idnani was called in for her fourth audition before they were finalised. The plot is combined with that of Tom Cruise's Days of Thunder (1990) and Will Ferrell's Talladega Nights: The Ballad of Ricky Bobby (2006) — the protagonist meets with an accident while racing and then makes a comeback destroying his nemesis race driver – and Will Smith's The Pursuit of Happyness (2006), where a father and son have to move out of their house, due to the loss of a job.

The cars used in racing scenes were provided by Andy Hillenburg, who purchased Rockingham Speedway months after its release and provided the stunt drivers, as many ARCA Re/Max Series drivers participated in the filming (ARCA Re/Max Series stickers can be found on the cars in the movie; Hillenberg trained stunt drivers, along with letting some film stars take turns driving). Some cars that can be seen in Ta Ra Rum Pum display high resemblance to cars specifically created for Talladega Nights: The Ballad of Ricky Bobby (except featuring modified sponsorship decals) as Hillenburg provided cars for that film as well.

The title song of Ta Ra Rum Pum is a 4-minute animated endeavour with all the main characters of the film and 4 other animated characters. This song was performed by Walt Disney Studios as part of their 3-film deal with Yash Raj Films.

Ta Ra Rum Pum was released on 27 April 2007.

Music 
The music of Ta Ra Rum Pum was composed by the duo Vishal–Shekhar and Javed Akhtar penned the lyrics. The soundtrack of the film contains 7 songs. According to the Indian trade website Box Office India, with around 10,00,000 units sold, this film's soundtrack album was the year's fifteenth highest-selling.

Telugu soundtrack

Response

Box office
Ta Ra Rum Pum opened to an average response in cinemas, where collections were reported to be as low as 50%. However, the film saw a good opening of 90%-95% in the big cities such as Mumbai and Delhi, catering to the kids and family audiences; the smaller cinemas received an average response of 50%–70%. Though the film opened to an average response, the next two days saw a huge jump in collections. The collections dropped on Monday by about 55%–70%. In its first week, the film collected an impressive Rs. 43.7 million in Mumbai, and did well at the multiplexes but moderately at the single screens. The overall gross for the first week in India stands at Rs. 114,392,260. The release of Spider-Man 3 caused a drop in collections, but the film has continued to do well in Mumbai and Delhi. Ta Ra Rum Pum became the 10th highest-grossing film of 2007 so far, with box office figures of Rs. 362.0 million.

The three main markets overseas – the UK, USA and Australia – saw a similar opening. Ta Ra Rum Pum collected during the weekend and debuted at #9 on the UK film chart which was a good opening. In the United States, the film collected $425,102 which was a fair opening. In Australia, it collected $90,000. Though the weekend figures were good, the collections were below expectations for a Yash Raj film. The film was given an above-average status in the United States and was a hit in the United Kingdom.

In its sixth week, the film had collected Rs. 377.0 million and was declared a hit in India. Overseas, the film has collected $2,000,000 in the United Kingdom.

Reception 
On Rotten Tomatoes, the film has an approval rating of 50% based on 8 critics reviews.

Taran Adarsh of Indiafm.com gave Ta Ra Rum Pum a rating of 3.5 out of 5. He praised the performances of Khan and Mukerji, saying "Khan is extremely likable. He conveys the varied emotions with complete understanding. Mukerji enacts the role of the mother proficiently".

It is inspired by Days of Thunder (1990) and Talladega Nights: The Ballad of Ricky Bobby (2006), though film critic Rajeev Masand pointed out that "the plot has been borrowed generously from films such as Life Is Beautiful (1997), In America (2002) and Cinderella Man (2005)."

Awards

Sabsey Favourite Kaun Awards
 Won – Sabsey Favourite Heroine – Rani Mukerji

See also 
 List of films set in New York City

References

External links 
 Official movie page
 

2007 films
Films scored by Vishal–Shekhar
2000s Hindi-language films
Indian auto racing films
Indian films set in New York City
Yash Raj Films films
Films directed by Siddharth Anand
Indian sports drama films
Indian films with live action and animation
Films shot in New York City
2000s sports drama films
2007 drama films